Metilia boliviana is a species of mantis of the family Acanthopidae.

References 

Mantodea of South America
Acanthopidae
Insects described in 1927